Rosenbergia lactiflua is a species of beetle in the family Cerambycidae. It was described by Fairmaire in 1883. It is known from Papua New Guinea and Solomon Islands. It includes the varietas Rosenbergia lactiflua var. coerulescens.

References

Batocerini
Beetles described in 1883